Vardon is a community settlement in south-central Israel. Located north of Kiryat Gat and south of Kiryat Malakhi, it falls under the jurisdiction of Yoav Regional Council.

History
It was founded in 1964 as a village center and became a communal village in 1998. It was founded on land belonging to the Arab Palestinian villages of Summil and  Jusayr, both of which were depopulated in the 1948 Arab–Israeli War.

The name of the community is a loose translation for the family of Julius Rosenwald who was a Jewish donor from the United States. ("Vardon" is derived from vered, which means "rose", hence Rosenfeld.

Education
Vardon, being a small community, has no schools, so it relies on schools of the Yoav Regional Council and the surrounding communities.  The residents may go to either secular or religious schools.  The elementary schools are "Sdot Yoav" in kibbutz Gat and "Yad Hazon" in Be'er Tuvia.  High schools are "Tzafit" in Kfar Menahem and "Gruss" in Kiryat Gat.

Facilities
In Vardon there is a youth center, a sports field, public gardens, playgrounds, and a regional infirmary.

References

Community settlements
Populated places in Southern District (Israel)
1964 establishments in Israel
Populated places established in 1964